The Dance of Death is a 1967 West German drama film directed by Michael Verhoeven and starring Lilli Palmer, Paul Verhoeven and Karl Michael Vogler. It is an adaptation of August Strindberg's play of the same title. It was shot in Eastmancolor.

Plot
An egocentric artillery Captain and his venomous wife engage in savage unremitting battles in their isolated island fortress off the coast of Sweden at the turn of the century. Alice, a former actress who sacrificed her career for secluded military life with Edgar, reveals on the occasion of their 25th wedding anniversary, the veritable hell their marriage has been. Edgar, an aging schizophrenic who refuses to acknowledge his severe illness, struggles to sustain his ferocity and arrogance with an animal disregard for other people. Sensing that Alice, together with her cousin and would-be lover, Kurt, may ally against him, retaliates with vicious force. Alice lures Kurt into the illusion of sharing a passionate assignation and recruits him in a plot to destroy Edgar.

Cast
 Lilli Palmer as Alice
 Paul Verhoeven as Edgar
 Karl Michael Vogler as Kurt
 Ilona Grübel as Judith
 Michael von Harbach as Allan
 Melanie Horeschowsky as Maja
 Dietrich Kerky as Prisoner
 Dieter Klein as Ekmark
 Inken Sommer as Jenny

References

Bibliography
 Reimer, Robert C. & Reimer, Carol J. The A to Z of German Cinema. Scarecrow Press, 2010.

External links

1967 films
1967 drama films
German drama films
West German films
1960s German-language films
Films directed by Michael Verhoeven 
Films based on works by August Strindberg
German films based on plays
Films set in the 1900s
Films set on islands
Films set in the Baltic Sea
Films set in Sweden
1960s German films